Rachel Therrien is a French-Canadian jazz trumpeter, composer and bandleader. Besides trumpet she also plays flugelhorn. Winner of the 2015 TD Grand Prize Jazz Award at the renowned Montreal International Jazz Festival and the 2016 Stingray Jazz Rising Star Award, her 5th album VENA got nominated as Best Jazz Album of the Year at the Canadian JUNOs of 2021 and the Quebec ADISQ Awards 2020.

Discography
 On Track (2011)
 Home Inspiration (2014)
 Pensamiento: Proyecto Colombia (2016)
 Why Don't You Try? (2017)
 VENA (2020)

Honours 
Wins:
 2019 50e Prix LOJIQ (CA), Les Offices Jeunesses Internationales de Québec
 2016 Stingray Rising Star Award (CA), Halifax Jazz Festival
 2015 TD Grand Prize Jazz Award (CA), Montreal International Jazz Festival

Nominations:
 2021 Juno Awards (CA), Best Jazz Album: Solo (VENA)
 2020 ADISQ Awards (CA), Best Jazz Album (VENA)
 2018 Independent Music Awards (US), Best Jazz Record Producer (Why Don't You Try?)

References

External links

Living people
Canadian jazz trumpeters
Musicians from Quebec
People from Rimouski
21st-century Canadian composers
Year of birth missing (living people)
Canadian women composers
Canadian jazz composers
21st-century Canadian women musicians